James Nathan Castle (May 23, 1836 – January 2, 1903) was a U.S. Representative from Minnesota; born in Shefford in Lower Canada; he attended the public schools; studied law; moved to Afton, Washington County, Minnesota, in 1862 and taught school; completed his law studies; was admitted to the bar and practiced; moved to Stillwater, Washington County in 1865 and continued the practice of law; elected county attorney in 1866 to fill the unexpired term of his deceased brother; city attorney in 1868; elected to the Minnesota Senate in 1868, 1878, and 1882; elected as a Democrat to the 52nd United States Congress (March 4, 1891 – March 3, 1893); chairman of the United States House Committee on Mileage (52nd Congress); unsuccessful candidate for reelection in 1892 to the 53rd United States Congress; engaged in the practice of law until his death in Stillwater; interment in Fairview Cemetery.

References

1836 births
1903 deaths
Democratic Party Minnesota state senators
Democratic Party members of the United States House of Representatives from Minnesota
19th-century American politicians